Van Heteren is a surname. Notable people with the surname include:

 Adri van Heteren (born 1951), Dutch politician
 Jan van Heteren (1916–1992), Dutch water polo player
 Sanny van Heteren (born 1977), German actress

Surnames of Dutch origin